Bowling Green Township, Ohio, may refer to:

Bowling Green Township, Licking County, Ohio
Bowling Green Township, Marion County, Ohio

Ohio township disambiguation pages